Firozpur, also known as Ferozepur, is a city on the banks of the Sutlej River in Firozpur District, Punjab, India. After the partition of India in 1947, it became a border town on the India–Pakistan border with memorials to soldiers who died fighting for India.

History
The city of Firozpur was founded by Firuz Shah Tughlaq , a ruler of the Tughluq dynasty, who reigned over the Sultanate of Delhi from 1351 to 1388. It is located on the banks of the Sutlej River on the India–Pakistan border. The nearby Firozpur Cantonment is a major cantonment of the country.

British rule was first established in 1835, when, on the failure of heirs to the Sikh family who possessed it, a small escheat to the British government was formed, and the district was gradually formed around this nucleus. The strategic importance of Ferozepur (as it was spelled under the British) was at this time very great, and in 1839 it was the outpost of British India in the direction of the Sikh power. It accordingly became the scene of operations during the First Anglo-Sikh War, in which the Sikhs crossed the Sutlej in December 1845, but were defeated and withdrew into their own territory, and peace was concluded with the Treaty of Lahore. Later, throughout the Indian Mutiny Ferozepur remained in the hands of the English.

The Saragarhi Memorial Gurudwara commemorates 21 Sikh soldiers of the 36th Sikh Regiment who died in the Battle of Saragarhi, defending a signal post against an overwhelming enemy force on 12 September 1897.The 21 soldiers defended the Saragarhi Fort against the attack of 10000 invaders All the 21 Soldiers were awarded Indian Order of Merit. 20 out of the 21 soldiers were from Ferozepur.

The Barki Memorial, built in 1969, is a memorial to the soldiers of the 7 Infantry Division who died in a battle in 1965 which led to India taking the town of Barki, 15 miles south-east of Lahore.

Geography

Climate

Demographics

As of the 2011 Indian Census, Firozpur had a total population of 110,313, of which 58,451 (53%) were male and 51,862 (47%) were female. 10.6% of the population was six years old or younger. The total number of literate people in Firozpur was 78,040, which constituted 70.7% of the population, with male literacy of 73.3% and female literacy of 67.9%. The effective literacy rate (population of 7 years and above) was 79.1%, of which male literacy rate was 82.3% and female literacy rate was 75.6%. The Scheduled Caste population was 27,395. Firozpur had 22,263 households in 2011.

Religion
According to the 2011 census, out of total population of 110,313 in Firozpur city, Hinduism is followed by 77,743 (70.5%) people and Sikhism by 28,961 (26.3%). Minorities religions include Christianity, Islam, Jainism, and Buddhism.

Media
Firozpur has an All India Radio Relay station known as Akashvani Firozpur. It broadcasts on 100.1 MHz frequency.

Notable people

Susham Bedi, author
Preet Bharara, attorney and media personality
Sohraab Dhaliwal, cricketer
Sher Singh Ghubaya, politician
Annie Gill, actress
Balram Jakhar, politician
Zora Singh Maan, politician
Verma Malik, lyricist
Narain Chand Parashar, politician
Bano Qudsia, writer
Janmeja Singh Sekhon, politician
Ajit Pal Singh, hockey player
Gagan Ajit Singh, hockey player
Ganda Singh, revolutionary
Gurbaj Singh, hockey player
Princepal Singh, basketball player
Ronjan Sodhi, shooter
Manav Vij, actor
Ashwani Kumar, Basketball Coach

Notes

External links
 
 

Punjab
 
Populated places established in the 14th century
Cities and towns in Firozpur district